Simon van Duivenbooden (born 11 May 2002) is a Dutch professional footballer who plays as a forward for Eredivisie club Vitesse.

Club career
Van Duivenbooden is a youth product of Legmeervogels, Alphense Boys, Vitesse, and PSV successively. He returned to Vitesse, signing a contract on 20 May 2021. He made his professional debut with Vitesse in a 3–1 Eredivisie loss to AZ, coming on as a sub in the 81st minute.

Personal life
Van Duivenbooden was born in the Netherlands and is of South African descent, holding dual citizenship.

References

External links
 
 Eredivie profile

2002 births
Living people
People from Uithoorn
Dutch footballers
Dutch people of South African descent
SBV Vitesse players
Association football forwards
Eredivisie players
Footballers from North Holland